The Answer Key, also known as A Cure for Terminal Loneliness, is a Canadian short drama film, directed by Samir Rehem and released in 2007. The film stars Joe Pingue as Joseph Strobe, a government contractor who faces the greatest challenge of his life when he tests positive for the affliction of terminal loneliness, and Robin Brûlé as Dawn Moore, a woman who may offer him his only chance at saving his life.

The film premiered at the 2007 Toronto International Film Festival under the Cure for Terminal Loneliness title. It was screened at the 2008 CFC Worldwide Short Film Festival as The Answer Key, where Brendan Steacy won the award for Best Cinematography in a Canadian Short Film.

The film was a Genie Award nominee for Best Live Action Short Drama at the 29th Genie Awards in 2009.

References

External links

2007 films
2007 short films
2000s English-language films
Canadian drama short films
2000s Canadian films